Peter Adam Daiches Dubens (born 1966), is a British internet entrepreneur and investor. He is the founder of Oakley Capital and its associated group of companies.  He has earned a reputation for avoiding publicity.

Early life and education
He attended Sussex House Preparatory School in Cadogan Square, Chelsea and then the Jewish Free School in Camden, North London.

Career 
Peter Dubens became an entrepreneur in 1985 after the launch of his thermochromic t-shirt company (age 18). He sits on the board of Time Out PLC. After his t-shirt business, which he sold to Coats Viyella Plc for £8 million along with its 6 airport branches in 1990, Dubens became the Co-Founder of Global Inc Limited, a certified clothing supplier to UK leading retailers Marks and Spencers, C&A, and the Arcadia Group. Later that year, he became Co-founder of Global Accessories Limited (a UK distributor for Vans shoes and Eastpak bags). In 2002, he set up a private equity fund manager, Oakley Capital.

In June 2020, Dubens bought £803,000 worth of stock in Time Out Group plc at a price of £0.35 per share.

Political activity
Dubens is a significant donor to the Conservative Party. He donated £50,000 to the party in May 2017 and £200,000 and £50,000 in December 2019. During the 2019 United Kingdom general election campaign Dubens donated £250,000 to the party. Dubens is a member of the party's Advisory Board for significant donors.

Philanthropy
Established in 2019, the Peter Dubens Family Foundation (registered charity number 1187030) supports mainly UK charities and charitable projects in the areas of education, marine conservation, children’s welfare, and health.

References 

Living people
British investors
Conservative Party (UK) donors
People educated at Sussex House School
1966 births